Clark County Park Police is a police agency in Clark County, Nevada.  The department is responsible for providing law enforcement in Parks within Clark County, county facilities, and other areas as needed. Clark County Park Police Officers are Nevada category 1 peace officers. Clark County Park Police operate mainly outside of the city of Las Vegas. Clark County Park Police is also responsible for law enforcement and calls for service at the Clark County Wetlands Park.

External links 
 

Specialist police departments of Nevada
County law enforcement agencies of Nevada
Government of Clark County, Nevada
Park police departments of the United States